Hıfzı is a Turkish given name for males. People named Hıfzı include:

 Ahmet Hıfzı Pasha, Ottoman military personnel
 Hıfzı Topuz (born 1923), Turkish journalist, travel writer and novelist

Turkish masculine given names